Konrad Schmid (theologian) Konrad Schmid (born 23 October 1965) is Professor of Hebrew Bible and Ancient Judaism at the University of Zurich, Switzerland.

Biography 
Konrad Schmid is the son of the Zurich Old Testament Professor Hans Heinrich Schmid (1937–2014). Between 1985 and 1990 he completed his studies in theology at the University of Zurich, Greifswald, and Munich and received his Ph.D. in Theology in Zurich in 1995. From 1999-2002 he was Professor of Hebrew Bible at the University of Heidelberg, Germany. He served as Member in Residence at the Center of Theological Inquiry, Princeton (2006–07) and was a Fellow of the Israel Institute for Advanced Studies in Jerusalem (2012–2013), co-directing a research group on Convergence and Divergence in Pentateuchal Theory: Bridging the Academic Cultures in Israel, North America, and Europe. In 2017, he was a member of the Institute for Advanced Study in Princeton. Since 2017, he serves as president of the Wissenschaftliche Gesellschaft für Theologie and as member of the National Research Council of the Swiss National Science Foundation.

Publications (selection) 
 Genesis and the Moses Story. Israel’s Dual Origins in the Hebrew Bible. Winona Lake 2010, .
 The Old Testament. A Literary History. Minneapolis 2012, .
 Is There Theology in the Hebrew Bible? (= Critical Studies in the Hebrew Bible (CrStHB) Bd. 4). Winona Lake 2015, .

References

External links 
 Website of Konrad Schmid in English

1965 births
20th-century Swiss people
21st-century Swiss people
Old Testament scholars
Protestant theologians
Swiss Protestant theologians
Living people